Mexx is a Dutch fashion brand that was created by Rattan Chadha in 1986 by merging his brands Moustache (for men) and Emmanuelle (for women). Take the first letter of both brands and add two kisses to it: Mexx. M (oustache) + E (manuelle) + XX (two kisses) = MEXX. The advertising campaign ‘‘Everything should be XX’’ from 1986 caught on attention and Mexx became popular.

Mexx has grown into an international brand in women, men and children's clothing with stores in more than 50 countries. With a production of 40 million pieces, Mexx was one of the top thirty largest brands in Europe in 2010. Since the second quarter of 2008, however, Mexx has been facing declining sales and has had to close the stores. In 2001 Mexx was bought by the American Liz Claiborne (LCI), which sold it in the autumn of 2011 to a joint venture with the Gores Group.

From 1985 to 2008 the company was located in Voorschoten, in the former silver factory of Koninklijke Van Kempen & Begeer. After that, the head office was located in the former European head office of Nissan in the Amsterdam Riekerpolder.

On December 4 in 2014, three holding companies of the group were declared bankrupt by the Amsterdam District Court. [3] In February 2015, Mexx made a restart under the wing of the Turkish clothing and retail company Eroglu.

Two years later, in 2017, the company came back into Dutch hands, the Brabant- based RNF Holding. The Mexx shoe collection was relaunched in 2018. The spring / summer collection of 2021 is the first collection for Mexx fashion to be designed from the office of Mexx in Drunen. A relaunch campaign started with the quote ‘‘Everything should be XX’’.

Several years after leaving the Canadian market, Mexx returned to Canada under a distribution deal with Walmart Canada. The collection consists of shoes, clothing, and home accents.

References

External links

Mexx Europe

Clothing brands of the Netherlands
Shoe companies of the Netherlands
Eyewear brands of the Netherlands
Clothing companies of the Netherlands
Dutch brands
Companies that have filed for bankruptcy in Canada